Arriya Yenyueak (born 1 August 2000) is a Thai cricketer. In July 2018, she was named as a member of Thailand's squad for the 2018 ICC Women's World Twenty20 Qualifier tournament. She made her Women's Twenty20 International (WT20I) debut for Thailand on 14 January 2019, in the Thailand Women's T20 Smash, taking a wicket with the one and only ball she bowled in the match.

In August 2019, she was named in Thailand's squad for the 2019 ICC Women's World Twenty20 Qualifier tournament in Scotland.

References

External links
 

2000 births
Living people
Arriya Yenyueak
Arriya Yenyueak
Place of birth missing (living people)
Arriya Yenyueak